Twyman Park, on West Street in Poteau in Le Flore County, Oklahoma, has structures built in a Works Progress Administration project in 1937.  It was listed on the National Register of Historic Places in 1988.

It includes:
Two  picnic pavilions,
Swimming pool ( and bath house,
Caretaker's cottage,
Stone fence, and a 
Stone-lined drainage ditch

References

Historic districts on the National Register of Historic Places in Oklahoma
Romanesque Revival architecture in Oklahoma
Buildings and structures completed in 1937
LeFlore County, Oklahoma